Lance Mountain is a summit in the U.S. state of Georgia.

Lance Mountain has the name of Thomas Lance, a pioneer settler.

References

Mountains of Union County, Georgia
Mountains of Georgia (U.S. state)